Phil Penman (1977) is a British born Street photographer residing in New York City, USA.

Career 
Penman was born in Dorset, England. He received his formal training in photography from the Berkshire College of Art and design before working for local newspaper the Wokingham Times.

In 2000 Penman moved to Los Angeles and then onto New York for celebrity news agency Splash News. Penman photographed celebrities such as Bill Gates, Jennifer Lopez and Christopher Reeve, alongside covering news stories across the world for publications such as The Guardian, The Independent, Daily Telegraph as well as having features published in Paris Match.

His coverage of the September 11th World Trade Center terrorist attacks is included in the 9/11 Museum’s permanent archive.

He was listed as one of “The Best Street Photographers of 2019 according to the Phoblographer.

He shoots commercial campaigns for which his work was featured by the Luerzers Archive.

In 2021 Penman’s debut book “STREET” was launched for Street Photography as the Number 1 new release on Amazon and became a best seller and featured at MOMA , and Fotografiska in New York.

Penman work has been exhibited around the world and was recently featured by Vanity Fair and GQ Magazines.

References 

1977 births
Living people